The 20/20 Experience – 2 of 2 is the fourth studio album by American singer-songwriter Justin Timberlake. The album is considered the second half of a two-piece project, being supplemented by The 20/20 Experience (2013), his third studio album. It was released on September 27, 2013, by RCA Records. Its lead single "Take Back the Night" was released on July 12, 2013. Coinciding with the release of The 20/20 Experience – 2 of 2, the record was packaged with The 20/20 Experience and released as a compilation album titled, The 20/20 Experience – The Complete Experience. Upon its release, The 20/20 Experience – 2 of 2 received mixed reviews from critics. The third single "Not a Bad Thing" charted within the top ten on the US Billboard Hot 100 and topped the Mainstream Top 40 airplay chart. "Drink You Away" reached Country radio in November 2015, after being performed at the Country Music Association Awards.

The album, as part of the compilation The 20/20 Experience – The Complete Experience, was nominated for a Grammy Award in the category Best Pop Vocal Album.

Background 
In September 2006, Timberlake released his second studio album FutureSex/LoveSounds. Critically and commercially successful, the album spawned six singles, including the worldwide hits "SexyBack", "My Love" and "What Goes Around... Comes Around". After embarking on a worldwide concert tour in support of the album in 2007, Timberlake took a break from his music career to focus on acting. In addition, Timberlake worked behind-the-scenes with his record label Tennman Records (founded in 2007) and his production team The Y's (founded in 2008). He also provided guest vocals on several singles by other artists, such as "4 Minutes" by Madonna and "Carry Out" by Timbaland.

Development and title 

In 2010, Timberlake's manager, Johnny Wright, began conversations with the singer about working on new music and potential ways to deliver it to the public. Wright proposed a promotion based on an application or releasing a new song every month. Timberlake, however, was not interested in going back into music at the time and instead continued to focus on his film career. In 2012, Timberlake asked Wright to dinner and revealed to him that he had spent the last couple of nights in studio with Timbaland writing new songs. Wright was surprised to hear it. The two immediately began marketing plans for how the album should be promoted and when it should be released. They decided on a short time frame. Wright confirmed in the middle of July that the album was finished and described it as a "fast record". Timberlake had four weeks to record the material, because he had to shoot his scenes for the film Runner Runner. Although originally planned for release in October 2012, the album's date was postponed because of the singer's wedding with actress Jessica Biel. Wright stated that although the project involved artists who are Timberlake's friends, it was tough keeping the album a secret, so they used codenames. During an interview with American radio and television host Ryan Seacrest, Timberlake explained the meaning behind the album's title saying, "I'd say, 'What do you think of this?' And my best friend said, 'This is music that you can see,' and for some reason that stuck with me."

Release 
On March 16, 2013, record producer and drummer for The Roots, Questlove announced that Timberlake was planning to release a follow-up record to The 20/20 Experience in November. He referenced the album's 10-song track listing and title by saying, "10 songs now...10 songs later = 20 vision." Affirming Questlove's comments, album co-producer J-Roc revealed that the follow-up will consist of outtakes from the original album, as well as new material from upcoming studio sessions. Timberlake announced on May 5 that his fourth studio album, The 20/20 Experience: 2 of 2, would be released in September.

The 20/20 Experience: 2 of 2 was made available for pre-order on the iTunes Store on July 12, 2013. The record included eleven tracks, in addition to an unannounced "special surprise". Timberlake began announcing the album's track listing through a series of Instagram videos on August 14, 2013. On August 27, 2013, Timberlake revealed that frequent collaborator Jay-Z would be on the song "Murder", and rapper Drake would be on the song "Cabaret". On September 24, 2013, the album was released for free streaming on iTunes in its entirety.

Singles 
"Take Back the Night" was released as the album's lead single on July 12, 2013, after being teased in a video two days before. It was made available for digital download on the iTunes Store along with the album's pre-order. The music video for "Take Back the Night" was shot on July 18, 2013, in New York City and released on July 30, 2013. It was directed by Jeff Nicholas, Jonathan Craven and Darren Craig; the first two previously directed the music video for "Tunnel Vision" from The 20/20 Experience (2013). Commercially, it was a moderate success and managed to reach the top 40 positions in eight countries. It reached number 29 on the US Billboard Hot 100, and number 22 on the UK Singles Chart.

"TKO" was released as the second single from the album on September 20, 2013. The music video was released on October 29, 2013. It was directed by Ryan Reichenfeld and Timberlake's love interest in the video is played by Riley Keough. The single reached number 37 on the US Billboard Hot 100, and number 58 on the UK Singles Chart.

"Not a Bad Thing" was released to radio as the third official single off the album on February 25, 2014. The song peaked at number 8 on the Billboard Hot 100 and topped the Mainstream Top 40.

"Drink You Away" was released to country radio stations on November 23, 2015, following a positive reception of Timberlake's performance of the song at the 2015 Country Music Association Awards with Chris Stapleton.

Promotion 
To promote The 20/20 Experience and 2 of 2, Timberlake announced on May 5, 2013, that he would embark on The 20/20 Experience World Tour, his second concert tour on a global scale. Promoted primarily by AEG Live, the tour started on October 31, 2013, in Montreal, just two months after the Legends of the Summer tour concluded. Twenty-two additional dates were announced across Canada and the United States, ending on February 16, 2014, in Chicago, Illinois. Timberlake's official website noted that additional dates in Europe, South America, and Australia would follow.

Critical reception 

The 20/20 Experience – 2 of 2 received lukewarm reviews from music critics. At Metacritic, which assigns a normalized rating out of 100 to reviews from mainstream critics, the album received an average score of 60, based on 27 reviews, indicating "mixed or average reviews". In his review for the Chicago Tribune, Greg Kot wrote that it could have been a neat album of clever pop music had it been edited down. Kyle Anderson of Entertainment Weekly felt that the songs are too long and excessively unfocused, particularly "Only When I Walk Away". Stephen Carlick of Exclaim! said that it is less consistent than its predecessor, even though there are some successful pop songs. Pitchforks Ryan Dombal found Timberlake's pick up lines unpleasant and angst disingenuous, and accompanied by recycled production. Spin magazine's Jason King said that the album is somewhat disappointing because it lacks anything as immediate as "Let the Groove Get In" or as vibrant as "Pusher Love Girl" from the first album. Andy Gill of The Independent was not surprised by its inferiority because it used outtakes from the sessions for The 20/20 Experience. Al Horner of NME said that the overlong songs pass tediously as "pieces from the cutting-room floor cobbled together on the cheap".

In a positive review, Brice Ezell of PopMatters viewed the album as an improvement over its predecessor because the songs have more compelling pop structures. Annie Zaleski of The A.V. Club said that it benefited from Timberlake's additional time in the studio: "Timberlake reined in his musical vision just enough to make this album more focused and engaging—but didn’t lose sight of his desire to take chances." Slant Magazines Eric Henderson found it more believable than the first album because of how "its subject matter goes further into the disquieting root of what it means to be obsessed with a celebrity (Jackson) who was himself already intensely obsessed with his own persona."

Commercial performance
The album debuted at number one on the US Billboard 200 chart, with first-week sales of 350,000 copies in the United States, giving Timberlake his second number-one album of the year and third overall in the US. In its second week the album sold 70,000 more copies, bringing its total album sales to 420,000.

On the UK Albums Chart, it opened at number two behind Haim's album Days Are Gone, breaking Timberlake's streak of UK number one albums.

In November 2013, The 20/20 Experience – 2 of 2 was certified Platinum by the Recording Industry Association of America (RIAA) for sales of over 1,000,000 units in the US, giving Timberlake his fourth consecutive platinum album.

In 2013, The 20/20 Experience – 2 of 2 was ranked as the 40th most popular album of the year on the Billboard 200. The following year, The 20/20 Experience – 2 of 2 was ranked as the 32nd most popular album of 2014 on the Billboard 200.

As of June 18, 2014, The 20/20 Experience – 2 of 2 has sold over 1,137,000 copies in the United States, bringing its total to over 1,637,000 copies sold worldwide.

 Track listing Notes Timberlake, in addition to producing each track, serves as a vocal producer on all tracks and is credited as "JT" for the latter role.
 additional producer
 vocal producer
 "Pair of Wings" is a hidden track on CD and digital versions of the album. It starts approximately five minutes and 28 seconds (5:28) into "Not a Bad Thing".
"TKO" contains a sample from "Somebody's Gonna Off the Man", written and performed by Barry White.
"Only When I Walk Away" contains a sample from "Lustful", written and performed by Amedeo Minghi. The track also features additional vocals by Brenda Radney and James Fauntleroy.

PersonnelPrimary musicians and producersJustin Timberlake – vocals , guitar , keyboards , production , mixing
J-Roc – keyboards , bass , production 
Elliott Ives – guitar 
Timbaland – production 
Rob Knox – production 
Chris Godbey – engineering , mixing
Reggie Dozier – strings engineering , horns engineering 
Jimmy Douglass – mixingAdditional contributorsThe Benjamin Wright Orchestra – strings , horns 
Terry Santiel – percussion 
Daniel Jones – keyboards , additional production 
Brenda Radney – additional vocals 
James Fauntleroy – additional vocals 
Alejandro Baima – mixing assistance 
Matt Webber – mixing assistance 

Charts

Weekly charts

Year-end charts

Decade-end charts

Certifications

 Release history 
{| class="wikitable plainrowheaders"
|+Release dates for The 20/20 Experience – 2 of 2
! scope="col"| Country
! scope="col"| Date
! scope="col"| Edition
! scope="col"| Format
! scope="col"| Label
! scope="col"| Ref.
|-

! scope="row"| Australia
| rowspan="3"| September 27, 2013
| Deluxe
| CD
| rowspan="7"| Sony
|
|-

! scope="row" rowspan="2"| Germany
| Standard
| 
|
|-

| Deluxe
| CD
|
|-

! scope="row" rowspan="2"| Canada
| rowspan="8"| September 30, 2013
| Standard
| LP
|
|-

| Deluxe
| CD
|
|-

! scope="row" rowspan="2"| France
| Standard
| 
|<ref name="France standard">France standard edition of The 20/20 Experience':
CD: 
LP: </ref>
|-

| Deluxe
| CD
|
|-

! scope="row" rowspan="2"| United Kingdom
| Standard
| 
| rowspan="4"| RCA
|
|-

| Deluxe
| CD
|
|-

! scope="row" rowspan="2"| United States
| Standard
| rowspan="2"| 
|
|-

| Deluxe
|
|-

! scope="row" rowspan="2"| Italy
| rowspan="3"| October 1, 2013
| Standard
| rowspan="2"| CD
| rowspan="4"| Sony
|
|-

| Deluxe
|
|-

! scope="row"| Poland
| Standard
| 
|
|-

! scope="row"| Asia
| October 9, 2013
| Limited
| CD
|
|}

The 20/20 Experience – The Complete ExperienceThe 20/20 Experience – The Complete Experience is a compilation album comprising The 20/20 Experience and The 20/20 Experience – 2 of 2. RCA Records released it on September 27, 2013. The bonus tracks "Dress On", "Body Count", "Blindness", and "Electric Lady" are excluded from this release. The Complete Experience'' was nominated for Best Pop Vocal Album at the 56th Annual Grammy Awards.

Weekly charts

Certifications

References 

2013 albums
Justin Timberlake albums
RCA Records albums
Sequel albums
Albums produced by Jerome "J-Roc" Harmon
Albums produced by Justin Timberlake
Albums produced by Timbaland
Funk albums by American artists